DaWu Mountain, is a mountain of historical and cultural significance located north of the city of Xinyi in Guangdong province, China. The tallest peak is the Datian Peak, as the tallest peak in the west of Guangdong province, which is commonly reported as 1703.8 metres (5,588 ft) tall.

DaWu Mountain is associated with the Dawu Mountain Nature Reserve, which was declared as a municipal natural reserve by Xinyi Government in 1994, promoted as a provincial natural reserve. It is known for its plant resources and scenery.

Geography
The area is located in southwest Guangdong, just north of the city of Xinyi and to the south of the city of Gaozhou, located at 22°14′N to 22°17′N and 118°8′E to 111°15′E. It extends from 800 to 1704 metres (2,624 to 5,588 ft) above sea level and covers an area of 3534 hectares (35.3 sq mi) at its base. The Datian Peak is 1703.8 metres(5,588 ft), the second tallest peak reaches 1423 metres(4,667 ft).

Climate
The climate is warm and humid. The area is natural boundary in tropic and subtropics of South China.The yearly average temperature is between 17 ℃ to 18 ℃, the annual precipitation is between 2300 mm to 2600 mm and the annual average relative humidity is about 85%.

Natural resources
The area is between the tropical zone and the subtropical zone, is a transitional zone with distribution of various flora in south China. With superior natural condition, the Dawu Mountain Nature Reserve, as one of the most well-preserved natural ecological system in southwest Guangdong, abounds in animal and plant resources, including a wild range of rare species, and has contained tremendous economic plant resources.

Vegetation
The forest coverage of this area is about 98%, which plant resources are rich and there are 195 families, 703 genera and 1453 species of wild higher plants in which 20 species are under national protection and 3 species under provincial protection. Medicinal plants over 500 species and include gynostemma pentaphyllum, Paris polyphylla, dysosma versipellis and Dendrobium nobile, which are renowned throughout the country. Some trees are very old and famous, notably the Han Dynasty Cypresses (planted 2,100 years ago by Emperor Wu Di of the Han Dynasty), 'Welcoming Guest Pine' (500 years old) and 'Fifth Rank Pine' (named by Emperor Qin Shi Huang of the Qin Dynasty and replanted some 250 years ago).

Rare animals
Among them, the first class protected animals are the leopard, Elliot's pheasant, yellow-bellied pheasant, monitor lizard, boa. The second class protected animals are the Crested Serpent Eagle, Palea steindachneri, Rana tigerina, giant salamander, pangolin, rasse, golden cat.

Natural landscape
It is one of eight scenic spots of XinYi. Because of the southeast side of it is influenced by the Pacific climate, in addition it has big amplitude of temperature changes, so that the clouds and mist drift through the mountains, providing tourists the wonderful sights to appreciate.

Local legend
In ancient times, it was a tremendous jade called south jade that in the bottom of the lake. It was said that people who bathed in that lake would have bright white skin. So there were seven fairies from the welkin spending a whole day for bathing in that lake on midsummer every year. One year, a cow boy who gazed his cattle and horses near the lake and then peeped the sight of bathing by those fairies. After one of those fairies called Scarlet who found that they had been peeped by that cowboy, she breathed on the lake surface, leading to make the mountain surrounded by wind and fog so that the cowboy was not able to see them at all, which is the reason of the name of DaWu mountain.

References

Mountains of Guangdong